The Fourth District School is a historic district school building on Old Post Road in North Branford, Connecticut.  Built about 1800, it is a rare surviving example of a late 18th-century schoolhouse in Connecticut.  It was moved to its present location from a more rural setting in 1928.  It was listed on the National Register of Historic Places in 1985.  It is now owned and maintained by the Totoket Historical Society as a museum property.

Description and history
The Fourth District School is located on the north side of the village of Northford, on the east side of Old Post Road just north of the Edward Smith Library.  It is a single-story wood frame structure, with a gabled roof and clapboarded exterior.  Its long side is set parallel to the street, with two windows and a single door.  Some of its exterior features, including the clapboards and plank door, are original, while others are the result of a sensitive restoration in 1965.  The interior, including plaster-on-lath walls with wooden wainscoting, also date to the restoration as a recreation of the original features.  When used as a school, it was probably originally fitted with benches facing a high teacher's desk.

North Branford's fourth district was established in 1769, and classes were typically held in the meeting house during the winter months. It was moved in 1928 to prevent its demolition, and underwent a major restoration in 1965.

See also
National Register of Historic Places listings in New Haven County, Connecticut

References

External links
Totoket Historical Society website

		
National Register of Historic Places in New Haven County, Connecticut
School buildings on the National Register of Historic Places in Connecticut
School buildings completed in 1800
North Branford, Connecticut
Museums in New Haven County, Connecticut
History museums in Connecticut